Aandhi is a Hindi television serial that aired on Zee TV in November 2003. The serial was produced by Manish Goswami. It was based on the concept of how a mistaken identity can bring ups and downs in one's relationships.

Plot
The story is based on the life of a girl named Chandni, who gets mistaken for someone else. Chandni is in love with a boy of whom her father disapproves. She leaves home and then her life takes a new turn. A friend of hers who's a young widow dies unexpectedly, leaving her child in Chandni's custody. The friend's in-laws, who hadn't met her earlier, assume Chandni to be their daughter-in-law.

Cast
 Simone Singh as Chandni
 Faisal Khan as Siddhanth
 Ayub Khan as Varun
 Kanika Kohli as Nisha
 Jyoti Mukherjee as Kanchan Singh
 Roma Bali as Pooja
 Vinay Jain as Captain Karan Singh
 Kiran Kumar as Diwan Singh
 Naresh Suri
 Rana Jung Bahadur
 Akshay Singh
 Seema Bhargava as Bua Ji
 Subhash Kapoor
 Ajay Trehan
 Nayan Bhatt as Siddhanth's Grandmother
 Shishir Sharma as Chandni's Father
 Rocky Verma as Raja - Underworld Shooter

References

 

2003 Indian television series debuts
2004 Indian television series endings
Indian television soap operas
Zee TV original programming